USS Turner may refer to the following ships of the United States Navy:

 , a Clemson-class destroyer commissioned in 1919; converted to a water barge in 1936 as USS Moosehead (IX-98) in 1943; scrapped in 1947
 USS Turner (DD-506),  a planned destroyer; contract was cancelled, 1941
 , a Gleaves-class destroyer commissioned in 1943 and destroyed by internal explosions in 1944
 , a Gearing-class destroyer commissioned in 1945 and decommissioned in 1969

See also
 
 

United States Navy ship names